Head Injuries is an American pop punk band from Fort Collins, Colorado formed in 2012. The group consists of Jared Russel (lead vocals, Guitar), Zack Hill (guitar, vocals), Coty Eikenberg (bass) and Nate Rodriguez (drums).

The band formed in October 2012 and recorded the "Boogie Nights EP" with Brandon Carlisle of Teenage Bottlerocket that same month. In 2012 the band headed out on "The Mission To Del Taco Tour". And later that year, the group recorded its debut self-titled album at Black in Bluhm Studio, in Denver, Colorado; the album was released in January 2013. In July 2013 the band supported its debut album on "The Mission To Get Buck Tour". The group recorded its next album, "Bail", at The Blasting Room, in Fort Collins, Colorado with Andrew Berlin and Bill Stevenson.

History
The band formed in October 2011 and recorded its debut release titled "Boogie Nights EP" the same month with Brandon Carlisle of Teenage Bottlerocket. The group embarked on its first tour, "The Mission To Del Taco Tour", in 2012. Later the same year the band recorded its debut self- titled album.

Band members

Current members
 Jared Russell –  Lead vocals, guitar (2012–present), 
 Zack Hill – guitar, vocals (2012–present)
 Coty Eikenberg – bass (2014–present)
 Nate Rodriguez – drums (2015–present)

Tours

2012
 The Mission To Del Taco

2013
 The Mission To Get Buck Tour

2014
 Jägermeistour

2015
 Bail Tour
 Head Injuries Goes West

Discography

EPs
 Boogie Nights EP (2011, Self-released)
 One Night Stand (2014, Self-released)

Studio albums
 Head Injuries (2013, Self-released)
 Bail (2015, Self-released)

Music videos
 "Greatest Felony'' (2013)

References

American pop punk groups